Joseph Alexander Ranson (December 28, 1900 – July 1, 1945) was an American Negro league catcher in the 1920s.

A native of New Orleans, Louisiana, Ranson played for the Cleveland Elites in 1926. In nine recorded games, he posted two hits in 19 plate appearances. Ranson died in South Bend, Indiana in 1945 at age 44.

References

External links
 and Seamheads

1900 births
1945 deaths
Cleveland Elites players
Baseball catchers
Baseball players from New Orleans
20th-century African-American sportspeople